Secondary reference points to the representation as a necessary part in granting a meaning to a (part of a) sentence. In this approach, words that don't contribute to the representation are void; they can only provide a figurative expression. Examples of phrases which lack a secondary reference are 'a black Monday' (unless it is used figuratively) and Bernard Bolzano's 'round quadrangle'. Alexius Meinong's Types of objects can be mentioned here, too.

In the first case, one may have a representation of a Monday (or at least of something one calls a Monday), as well as of something black, but not of a 'black Monday', since these qualities don't combine ('Monday' being too abstract to be combined with a concrete quality such as a color). In the second case, there is an incongruity: a quadrangle can be represented, but not a round one; conversely, there can be a circle, but it can't be square. It may, therefore, be debated whether a representation is created here.

Another example is presented by George Berkeley. He says: "[...] Does it not require some pains and skill to form the general idea of a triangle (which is yet none of the most abstract, comprehensive and difficult) for it must be neither oblique nor rectangle, neither equilateral, equicrural, nor scalenon, but all and none of these at once?" (A Treatise Concerning the Principles of Human Knowledge, Introduction, section 13.) Berkeley is here criticizing John Locke, demonstrating that each representation is particular (i.e., individual).

Whether there is a meaning or not depends on the individual person: it is possible that a sentence has a meaning according to A, whereas B can't discern any. This may, e.g., result from relevant knowledge which A possesses and B lacks, as in the case where one should decide the answer to the question 'Is 15 a prime number?' and A knows what a prime number is and B doesn't; the sentence then doesn't have a meaning for B.

Literature

J. Doomen, "The Individuality of Meaning", in Linguistic and Philosophical Investigations vol. 5, no. 1 (Sept. 2006), pp. 121–135 (first occurrence of the term)

Philosophy of language